is a Japanese professional shogi player ranked 6-dan.

Early life
Takano was born in Yokohama, Kanagawa Prefecture on June 15, 1972. He entered the Japan Shogi Association's apprentice school in December 1984 at the rank 6-kyū under the tutelage of shogi professional Makoto Nakahara. He was promoted to 1-dan in March 1991 and was awarded full professional status and the rank of 4-dan in April 1998 after winning the 22nd 3-dan League (October 1997March 1998) with a record of 13 wins and 5 losses.

Promotion history
Takano's promotion history is as follows:
 6-kyū: 1984
 1-dan: 1991
 4-dan: April 1, 1998
 5-dan: October 21, 2003
 6-dan: February 22, 2011

References

External links
 ShogiHub: Professional Player Info · Takano, Hideyuki

1972 births
Japanese shogi players
Living people
Professional shogi players
People from Yokohama
Professional shogi players from Kanagawa Prefecture